Bina Shaheen Siddiqui is a Pakistani chemist and the Director of the H.E.J. Research Institute of Chemistry at the University of Karachi. Siddiqui graduated from the University of Karachi with an MPhil in 1978. In 1980, she graduated from the same university with a PhD in organic chemistry.

She specialises in the chemical components of Pakistan's indigenous plants. She was elected to The World Academy of Sciences in 1989, and was elected a Fellow of the Pakistan Academy of Sciences in 1997. She is also a Fellow of the Chemical Society of Pakistan.

Awards 

 Dr. Abdus Salam Prize in Chemistry (1986)
 Nishan-e-Azmat-e-Ilm Plaque, Karachi University (1989)
 Nishan-e-Azmat-e-Danish Plaque, Karachi University (1993)
 Nishane- Danish Plaque, Karachi University (1998)
 First Prize of the National Book Foundation (1997)
 Star Woman of the Year Award and gold medal by Star Girls and Women's Foundation (1997)
 Tamgha-i-Imtiaz, Government of Pakistan (2000)
 Khwarizmi Award by the President of Islamic Republic of Iran (2001)
 Sitara-i-Imtiaz by the Govt. of Pakistan (2004)
Distinguished National Professor (HEC)

Selected publications 

 Siddiqui B.S., Afshan F., Rasheed M., Kardar N., Begum S., Faizi S. (2002) Medicinal Plants - A Source of Potential Chemicals of Diverse Structures and Biological Activity. In: Şener B. (eds) Biodiversity. Springer, Boston, MA.

References 

Pakistani women scientists
Living people
Organic chemists
University of Karachi alumni
Academic staff of the University of Karachi
Women chemists
Year of birth missing (living people)